Eldin Karišik (born 18 March 1983) is a retired Bosnian-Swedish footballer.

He last played for Kristianstads FF as a midfielder.

References

External links

 
 Fotbolltransfers profile

1983 births
Living people
Bosnia and Herzegovina emigrants to Sweden
Swedish footballers
Sweden under-21 international footballers
Sweden youth international footballers
Allsvenskan players
Danish 1st Division players
Helsingborgs IF players
IFK Göteborg players
Viborg FF players
Varbergs BoIS players
Kristianstad FC players
Swedish expatriate footballers
Expatriate men's footballers in Denmark
Swedish expatriate sportspeople in Denmark
Association football midfielders